Calosoma digueti is a species of ground beetle in the subfamily Carabinae, found in Mexico.

Subspecies
These three subspecies belong to the species Calosoma digueti:
 Calosoma digueti colimaense (Lassalle, 2009)
 Calosoma digueti digueti (Lapouge, 1924)
 Calosoma digueti hoegei Breuning, 1928

References

digueti
Beetles described in 1924